The Nissan VEJ30 is a 90-degree, turbocharged, four-stroke, gasoline-powered, sports car racing engines, built by Nissan Motor Company, in the 1980s. All VEJ30 engines are in a V8 configuration, and use forced induction turbocharging.

Overview
In 1987, Nissan began work on an engine exclusively for race use; the result was the VEJ30 engine, developed by Yoshikazu Ishikawa. This engine was based on old technology, and was not a success. For 1988, the VEJ30 was improved by Yoshimasa Hayashi and renamed the VRH30.

Specifications
Nissan VEJ30, V8 (90°) cyl, 4-stroke, gasoline engine
2996cc, 85 × 66 mm (bore x stroke)
750-800 hp
Aluminum-alloy block and head
forged steel crankshaft with 5 main bearings
DOHC, 4 Valves/cylinder - 32 valves total
aspiration, 2 x IHI turbochargers with multipoint electronic fuel injection
firing order 1 - 8 - 7 - 3 - 6 - 5 - 4 - 2
dry sump
March 87T, 5 speed Manual gearbox

Applications
Nissan R87E

See also
 List of Nissan engines
 Nissan VRH engine
 Nissan VH engine
 Nissan VK engine
 Nissan

References

External links

VEJ30
World Sportscar Championship engines
V8 engines
Engines by model
Gasoline engines by model
Group C